The 2019 Nashville mayoral election took place on August 1, 2019, to elect the Mayor of Nashville, Tennessee. Incumbent David Briley, who succeeded Megan Barry following her resignation and won a special election to fill the remainder of her term, was eligible to run for reelection. In the August election, Briley came in second behind city councilman John Cooper; however, no candidate took more than 50 percent of the vote, forcing a runoff between Cooper and Briley on September 12, 2019. Cooper won the runoff definitively with 69 percent of the vote.

Candidates

Advanced to runoff
David Briley, incumbent Mayor of Nashville
John Cooper, member of the Metropolitan Council

Eliminated in first round
Jimmy Lawrence, small business owner
Julia Clark-Johnson, professional driving administrator and instructor
John Ray Clemmons, state representative for the 55th district
Harold "Hollywood Howie" Garoutte, retired U.S. Army sergeant and owner and operator of Southern Country Radio
Carol M. Swain, former professor at Vanderbilt University
Jon Sewell, small business owner and 2018 candidate 
Bernie Cox, musician 
Jody Ball, businessman and GOP candidate in US-5 
Nolan Starnes, community activist

Potential
Jeff Obafemi Carr, community organizer
Erica Gilmore, member of the Metropolitan Council
Daron Hall, Sheriff of Davidson County
James Shaw Jr., hero of the Nashville Waffle House shooting

Declined
Megan Barry, former Mayor of Nashville
Bill Freeman, real estate developer and owner of the Nashville Scene, Nashville Post, and Nfocus
Harold Love, state representative from the 58th district
Bob Mendes, member of the Metropolitan Council
Renata Soto, nonprofit executive and former director of Conexión Américas
Jeffrey Napier, U.S. Army veteran and former mechanic for Metro Nashville Government

Results

First round

Second round

External links
 Briley campaign website
 Clark-Johnson campaign website  
 Clemmons campaign website 
 Swain campaign website 
 Cooper campaign website
 Sewell campaign website

References

Nashville
Nashville
Mayoral elections in Nashville, Tennessee
August 2019 events in the United States